Andrei Aleksandrovich Grechishko (born 7 March 1986) is a former Russian professional football player.

Club career
He played in the Russian Football National League for FC Dynamo Bryansk in 2008.

External links
 
 

1986 births
Living people
Russian footballers
Association football midfielders
FC Dynamo Bryansk players
Sportspeople from Bryansk